Jehohanan (Yehohanan) was a man put to death by crucifixion in the 1st century CE, whose ossuary was found in 1968 when building contractors working in Giv'at ha-Mivtar, a Jewish neighborhood in northern East Jerusalem, accidentally uncovered a Jewish tomb. The Jewish stone ossuary had the Hebrew inscription "Jehohanan the son of Hagkol" (hence, sometimes, Johanan ben Ha-galgula). In his initial anthropological observations in 1970 at Hebrew University, Nicu Haas concluded Jehohanan was crucified with his arms stretched out with his forearms nailed, supporting crucifixion on a two-beamed Christian cross. However, a 1985 reappraisal discovered multiple errors in Haas's observations.  Zias and Sekeles later proposed that permanent vertical stakes were used, to which were affixed a horizontal beam, with the executed's arms tied and that death occurred from asphyxiation.

Anthropological observations

Initial observations, Haas, 1970
In his article "Anthropological Observations on the Skeletal Remains from Giv'at ha-Mivtar" published in the Israel Exploration Journal in 1970, Nicu Haas of the Department of Anatomy at Hebrew University, wrote of the remains of a man crucified: 

Haas was unable to examine the remains any further because of serious health problems, and while his conclusions became widely accepted by the general public, several errors in his observations were later identified by Joseph Zias and Dr. Eliezer Sekeles at the Hebrew University - Hadassah Medical School in their 1985 reappraisal.

Reappraisal, Zias & Sekeles, 1985
In 1985, Joe Zias, curator of the Israel Department of Antiquities and Museums, and Dr. Eliezer Sekeles, from the Hadassah Medical Center, reexamined the crucifixion remains. They alleged that Haas' analysis was fraught with errors: 

Zias and Sekeles also stated the presence of the scratch in one of the forearms "was not convincing" evidence of a nail wound: 

In conclusion, the findings of Zias and Sekeles do not indicate whether in this case a horizontal patibulum cross-beam was attached to the upright stake to which the victim's heel was nailed. The evidence was so ambiguous concerning the arms that Zias and Sekeles had to rely on the data provided by contemporary writings to support their reconstruction of the position of the arms as attached to a crossbar:

Their reconstruction includes a crossbar which condemned man could carry to the place of execution and which could be used repeatedly for attachment to the upright stake permanently fixed in the ground:

References

Sources
 

1st-century deaths
1st-century people
People executed by crucifixion
Year of birth unknown
1968 archaeological discoveries
1968 in Israel
People from Jerusalem
Archaeological discoveries in Israel
Archaeological discoveries in the West Bank
1st-century artifacts
1st-century Jews